Viridiphasma is a genus of insects in the family Mantophasmatidae. It is a monotypic genus consisting of the species Viridiphasma clanwilliamense, which is endemic to Western Cape Province, South Africa.

Its type locality is Clanwilliam Dam, Western Cape Province.

References

Mantophasmatidae
Monotypic insect genera
Insects of South Africa
Endemic fauna of South Africa